F60 is the series designation of five overburden conveyor bridges used in brown coal (lignite) opencast mining in the Lusatian coalfields in Germany. They were built by the former Volkseigener Betrieb TAKRAF in Lauchhammer and are the largest movable technical industrial machines in the world. As overburden conveyor bridges, they transport the overburden which lies over the coal seam. In operating condition, it weighs 13,600 metric tons making the F60 also one of the heaviest land vehicles ever made, beaten only by Bagger 293, which is a giant bucket-wheel excavator. Nevertheless, despite its immense size, it is operated by only a crew of 14.

The first conveyor bridge was built from 1969 to 1972, being equipped with a feeder bridge in 1977. The second was built from 1972 to 1974, having been equipped with a feeder bridge during construction. The third conveyor bridge was built from 1976 to 1978, being provided with a feeder bridge in 1985. The fourth and fifth conveyor bridges were built 1986–1988 and 1988–1991 respectively.

There are still four F60s in operation in the Lusatian coalfields today: in the brown coal opencast mines in Jänschwalde (Brandenburg, near Jänschwalde Power Station), Welzow-Süd (Brandenburg, near Schwarze Pumpe Power Station), Nochten and Reichwalde (Saxony, both near Boxberg Power Station). The fifth F60, the last one built, is in Lichterfeld-Schacksdorf and is accessible to visitors.

Technology

The F60 has two bogies, one on the dumping side (front) and one on the excavating side (back), which each run on two rails. In addition to the two rails on the excavating side, there are another two rails for the transformer and cable cars. There are a total of 760 wheels on the bogies, of which 380 are powered. All in all, the F60 is powered by two large electric motors which supply more than 1,800 horsepower of electricity.

The F60 has two bucket chain excavators of type ES 3750 on the sides to do preparatory work (see the panoramic photograph from the Jänschwalde mine), one each on the northern and southern crosswise conveyor.

The F60, including the two excavators, requires  of power.

The Lichterfeld F60

The overburden conveyor bridge of Lichterfeld-Schacksdorf, now shut down, was used from 1991 until 1992 in the brown coal mine Klettwitz-Nord near Klettwitz. It is open for visitors today as a project of the Internationale Bauausstellung Fürst-Pückler-Land (International Mining Exhibition Fürst-Pückler-Land) and is an anchor of the European Route of Industrial Heritage (ERIH).

This F60 is the last of five F60s. The installation was carried out between 1988 and 1991 in the Klettwitz-Nord opencast mine. The F60 began operation in March 1991. After the German reunification, the mine became the responsibility of the Lausitzer und Mitteldeutsche Bergbau-Verwaltungsgesellschaft (Lusatian and Middle-German Mining Administrative Society, LMBV), which closed the mine on the orders of the German federal government and renovated it economically and in a way not harmful to the environment.

Between 2000 and 2010, the Internationale Bauausstellung Fürst-Pückler-Land is pursuing the goal of giving new momentum to the region and the former opencast mine of Klettwitz-Nord has also been integrated into that concept. The mine has been converted into a 'visitors' mine' and the conveyor bridge has been accessible since 1998. Various sound and light installations help make the facility an attraction for visitors.

References

External links

 Web site about the F60 of the Internationalen Bauausstellung Fürst-Pückler-Land
 F60 via Google Maps in Welzow

European Route of Industrial Heritage Anchor Points
Engineering vehicles
Mining equipment
Surface mining
Surface mines in Germany
Takraf GmbH